Klokočov may refer to the following places:

 Czech Republic
Klokočov (Benešov District), formerly a farm in Benešov District near Bezmíř, Vojkov and Vrchotovy Janovice, now a naturist camping place
Klokočov (Havlíčkův Brod District), a village and municipality

 Slovakia 
Klokočov, Čadca District, a village and municipality
Klokočov, Michalovce District, a village and municipality